This is a guide to the size of the wards in Nuneaton and Bedworth based on the data from the 2001 UK Census. The entire population of the district was 119,132.

NB Ward populations may differ from the population of the suburb or village after which they are named, as ward boundaries are often somewhat arbitrary and do not always match the generally accepted boundaries of localities.

Nuneaton and Bedworth by population
Nuneaton and Bedworth, wards
Wards